Faisel Masrahi (born 24 January 1993) is a Saudi Arabian football player who currently plays as a goalkeeper for Al-Fayha.

References

External links
 

Living people
People from Khobar
1993 births
Association football goalkeepers
Saudi Arabian footballers
Al-Qadsiah FC players
Al-Fayha FC players
Saudi Arabia youth international footballers
Saudi First Division League players
Saudi Professional League players
Saudi Arabian sportspeople in doping cases
Doping cases in association football